Strongylacidon is a genus of sponges belonging to the family Chondropsidae.

The species of this genus are found in Southern Hemisphere.

Species

Species:

Strongylacidon bermuda 
Strongylacidon chelospinatum

References

Sponges